The 1855 United States Senate special election in Massachusetts was held during January 1855. Henry Wilson was elected to fill the remainder of the term left vacant by the resignation of Edward Everett.

Everett had resigned in 1854 over poor health and protest following his failure to vote against the Kansas-Nebraska Act. Prior to the election, Julius Rockwell had been appointed to the seat on an interim basis.

At the time, Massachusetts elected United States senators by a majority vote of each separate house of the Massachusetts General Court, the House and the Senate.

Background
In 1854, the anti-immigration, anti-slavery American Party (better known as Know-Nothings) swept the Massachusetts elections, taking nearly every seat in the legislature.

American Party caucus
Henry Wilson was nominated as the American Party candidate in a legislative caucus on January 13. Most of the House participated; none of the Senators did.

Opposition to Wilson
Following Wilson's endorsement by the caucus, public opposition was aroused against his election. On January 15, a printed circular called for a caucus of "all members in the House who believe in the freedom of debate, who refuse to sanction a high-handed course of political action, and who are opposed to the election of Hon. Henry Wilson to the United States Senate." The opposition caucus met and endorsed Alexander Bullock for Senator.

Election in the House
Much of the debate in the House surrounded Wilson's loyalty to the American Party, or his lack thereof. Wilson had been the Free Soil Party candidate for Governor in 1854 but aligned himself with the nativist Know Nothing movement after their sweeping victory, in an effort to strengthen the party's emphasis on opposition to slavery. (The Free Soil Party had been dissolved into the new Republican Party.)

On January 23, the House convened and elected Wilson on the first ballot. His candidacy was then sent to the Senate for ratification.

Election in the Senate
On January 31, the State Senate convened and ratified the House's choice of Wilson.

Aftermath
Wilson joined Samuel Hoar's new anti-slavery Republican Party upon entering the Senate.

References

Massachusetts 1855
Massachusetts 1855
1855 Special
Massachusetts Special
United States Senate Special
United States Senate 1855